The following is an overview of events in 1987 in film, including the highest-grossing films, award ceremonies and festivals, a list of films released and notable deaths. Paramount Pictures celebrated its 75th anniversary in 1987.

Highest-grossing films (U.S.)

The top ten 1987 released films by box office gross in North America are as follows:

Events
 January 31 – The Cure for Insomnia premieres at The School of the Art Institute in Chicago, Illinois, to officially become the world's longest film according to Guinness World Records.
 May 23 – Starlog Salutes Star Wars is held in Los Angeles, California, the first officially sponsored Star Wars convention to commemorate the franchise's 10th anniversary.
 June 29 – The James Bond franchise celebrates its 25th anniversary and premieres its 15th film, The Living Daylights
 July 17 – Walt Disney's classic masterpiece Snow White and the Seven Dwarfs is re-released worldwide for its 50th anniversary.
 1987 – Paramount Pictures launches a new on-screen logo to celebrate its 75th anniversary, a variant used until 1989, and the standard variant of this logo was used from 1989 to 2002.

Awards
Academy Awards:
 
Best Picture: The Last Emperor - Hemdale, Columbia
Best Director: Bernardo Bertolucci - The Last Emperor
Best Actor: Michael Douglas - Wall Street
Best Actress: Cher - Moonstruck
Best Supporting Actor: Sean Connery - The Untouchables
Best Supporting Actress: Olympia Dukakis - Moonstruck
Best Foreign Language Film: Babette's Feast (Babettes Gæstebud), directed by Gabriel Axel, Denmark

Golden Globe Awards:

Drama:
Best Picture: The Last Emperor
Best Actor: Michael Douglas – Wall Street
Best Actress: Sally Kirkland – Anna
 
Musical or comedy:
Best Picture: Hope and Glory
Best Actor: Robin Williams – Good Morning, Vietnam
Best Actress: Cher – Moonstruck

Other
Best Director: Bernardo Bertolucci – The Last Emperor
Best Foreign Language Film: My Life as a Dog, Sweden

Palme d'Or (Cannes Film Festival):
Under the Sun of Satan (Sous le soleil de Satan), directed by Maurice Pialat, France

Golden Lion (Venice Film Festival):
Au revoir les enfants (Goodbye, Children), directed by Louis Malle, France / W. Germany

Golden Bear (Berlin Film Festival):
Tema (1979) (The Theme), directed by Gleb Panfilov, USSR

Wide-release films

January–March

April–June

July–September

October–December

Notable films released in 1987
United States unless stated

#
 84 Charing Cross Road, directed by David Jones, starring Anthony Hopkins, Anne Bancroft, Judi Dench - (UK/US)

A
 AAj, directed by Mahesh Bhatt, starring Kumar Gaurav, Smita Patil, Raj Babbar, and Raj Kiran (India)
 Adventures in Babysitting (aka A Night on the Town in the UK), directed by Chris Columbus, starring Elisabeth Shue, Keith Coogan, Anthony Rapp, and Maia Brewton.
 Aenigma, directed by Lucio Fulci, starring Jared Martin (Italy)
 Aha Naa Pellanta, directed by Jandhyala, starring Rajendra Prasad, and Rajani (India)
 The Allnighter, directed by Tamar Simon Hoffs, starring Susanna Hoffs, Dedee Pfeiffer, Joan Cusack, James Anthony Shanta, John Terlesky, and Michael Ontkean
 Amazing Grace and Chuck, directed by Mike Newell, starring Jamie Lee Curtis, William Petersen, Alex English, Gregory Peck
 Amazon Women on the Moon, compilation film co-directed by five directors: Joe Dante, Carl Gottlieb, Peter Horton, John Landis, and Robert K. Weiss. Starring Arsenio Hall, Griffin Dunne, Michelle Pfeiffer, Rosanna Arquette, Steve Guttenberg, Steve Forrest
 American Ninja 2: The Confrontation, directed by Sam Firstenberg, starring Michael Dudikoff, Steve James, and Larry Poindexter
 Angel Heart, directed by Alan Parker, starring Mickey Rourke, Robert De Niro, Lisa Bonet
 Anguish (Angustia), directed by Bigas Luna, starring Zelda Rubinstein - (Spain)
 Anna, directed by Yurek Bogayevicz, starring Sally Kirkland and Paulina Porizkova
 Aria, anthology film consisting of ten short films by ten different directors: Robert Altman, Bruce Beresford, Bill Bryden, Jean-Luc Godard, Derek Jarman, Franc Roddam, Nicolas Roeg, Ken Russell, Charles Sturridge, and Julien Temple. Starring Theresa Russell, Buck Henry, Beverly D'Angelo, John Hurt, Anita Morris, and Bridget Fonda. (U.K.)
 Assassination, directed by Peter R. Hunt, starring Charles Bronson, Jill Ireland, Stephen Elliott, Jan Gan Boyd, Randy Brooks, Michael Ansara, and William Prince. 
 Au revoir les enfants (Goodbye, Children), directed by Louis Malle, starring Gaspard Manesse, Raphael Fejtö, Philippe Morier-Genoud, and Francine Racette. Golden Lion award - (France)
 An Autumn's Tale (Chou tin dik tong wah), directed by Mabel Cheung, starring Chow Yun-fat, Cherie Chung, and Danny Chan (Hong Kong)

B
 Babette's Feast (Babettes Gæstebud), directed by Gabriel Axel, starring Stephane Audran - Academy Award for Best Foreign Language Film - (Denmark)
 Baby Boom, directed by Charles Shyer, starring Diane Keaton, Sam Shepard, Harold Ramis
 Back to the Beach, directed by Lyndall Hobbs, starring Frankie Avalon, Annette Funicello, Lori Loughlin, Tommy Hinkley, Connie Stevens, Don Adams, Bob Denver, and Pee-wee Herman
 Bad Taste, written and directed by Peter Jackson, starring Terry Potter, Pete O'Herne, Peter Jackson, Mike Minett, and Craig Smith. (New Zealand)
 Bagdad Café, aka Out of Rosenheim, directed by Percy Adlon, starring Marianne Sägebrecht, C. C. H. Pounder, and Jack Palance. Golden Space Needle award (for 1988) – (West Germany/United States)
 The Barbarians, directed by Ruggero Deodato, starring Peter Paul, David Paul, Richard Lynch, and Eva La Rue (United States/Italy)
 Barfly, directed by Barbet Schroeder, starring Mickey Rourke, Faye Dunaway, Alice Krige
 Batteries Not Included, directed by Matthew Robbins, starring Hume Cronyn and Jessica Tandy
 Beatrice, directed by Bertrand Tavernier, starring Bernard-Pierre Donnadieu, Julie Delpy, Monique Chaumette, Robert Dhéry, Michèle Gleizer, Nils Tavernier, Maxime Leroux, and Jean-Claude Adelin
 The Bedroom Window, directed by Curtis Hanson, starring Steve Guttenberg, Isabelle Huppert, Elizabeth McGovern
 The Believers, directed by John Schlesinger, starring Martin Sheen, Helen Shaver, Robert Loggia, Richard Masur, Harley Cross, and Jimmy Smits
 Bellman and True, directed by Richard Loncraine, starring Bernard Hill, Derek Newark, Richard Hope, Ken Bones, Frances Tomelty, and Kieran O'Brien.  (U.K.)
 The Belly of an Architect, directed by Peter Greenaway, starring Brian Dennehy, Chloe Webb - (U.K./Italy)
 Benji the Hunted, directed by Joe Camp, starring Red Steagall, and Frank Inn
 Best Seller, directed by John Flynn, starring James Woods and Brian Dennehy
 A Better Tomorrow II (Jing hung bun sik), directed by John Woo, starring Chow Yun-fat - (Hong Kong)
 Beauty and the Beast, directed by Eugene Marner, starring John Savage, and Rebecca De Mornay
 Beverly Hills Cop II, directed by Tony Scott, starring Eddie Murphy, Judge Reinhold, Jürgen Prochnow, Ronny Cox, John Ashton, Brigitte Nielsen, Allen Garfield, Dean Stockwell, and Paul Reiser
 Beyond Therapy, directed by Robert Altman, starring Julie Hagerty, Jeff Goldblum, Glenda Jackson
 The Big Easy, directed by Jim McBride, starring Dennis Quaid, Ellen Barkin, John Goodman, Ned Beatty
 Big Shots, directed by Robert Mandel, starring Darius McCrary, Robert Prosky, Paul Winfield
 The Big Town, co-directed by two directors: Harold Becker and Ben Bolt. Starring Matt Dillon, Diane Lane, Tommy Lee Jones, Suzy Amis, Lee Grant, Bruce Dern
 Black Widow, directed by Bob Rafelson, starring Debra Winger and Theresa Russell
 Blind Chance (Przypadek), directed by Krzysztof Kieślowski, starring Bogusław Linda (Poland)
 Blind Date, directed by Blake Edwards, starring Bruce Willis and Kim Basinger
 Blue Monkey, directed by William Fruet, starring Steve Railsback (Canada)
 Born in East L.A., directed by Cheech Marin, starring Cheech Marin
 Boyfriends and Girlfriends (French: L'Ami de mon amie), directed by Éric Rohmer, starring Emmanuelle Chaulet and Sophie Renoir (France)
 The Brave Little Toaster, directed by Jerry Rees, starring Deanna Oliver, Timothy E. Day, Jon Lovitz, Timothy Stack, Thurl Ravenscroft, Wayne Kaatz, Colette Savage, Phil Hartman, Joe Ranft, and Jim Jackman
 Broadcast News, directed by James L. Brooks, starring William Hurt, Albert Brooks, Holly Hunter, Lois Chiles, Robert Prosky, Joan Cusack
 Burglar, directed by Hugh Wilson, starring Whoopi Goldberg, Bobcat Goldthwait, G. W. Bailey, and Lesley Ann Warren
 Business as Usual, directed by Lezli-An Barrett, starring Glenda Jackson and John Thaw - (UK/US)
 Buy & Cell, directed by Robert Boris, starring Robert Carradine, Randall "Tex" Cobb, Imogene Coca, and Malcolm McDowell

C
 Can't Buy Me Love, directed by Steve Rash, starring Patrick Dempsey and Amanda Peterson
 Captain Khorshid (Nakhoda Khorshid), directed by Nasser Taghvai, starring Dariush Arjmand and Ali Nassirian (Iran)
 The Care Bears Adventure in Wonderland, directed by Raymond Jafelice, starring Bob Dermer, Eva Almos, Dan Hennessey, Jim Henshaw, Marla Lukofsky, Luba Goy, Keith Knight, Tracey Moore, Colin Fox, John Stocker, Don McManus, Elizabeth Hanna, Alan Fawcett, Keith Hampshire, and Alyson Court (Canada)
 Cherry 2000, directed by Steve De Jarnatt, starring Melanie Griffith, David Andrews, Tim Thomerson, and Pamela Gidley
 A Chinese Ghost Story (倩女幽魂), directed by Ching Siu-tung, starring Leslie Cheung, Joey Wong, and Wu Ma (Hong Kong)
 The Chipmunk Adventure, directed by Janice Karman, starring Ross Bagdasarian Jr., Janice Karman, Dody Goodman, Susan Tyrrell, Anthony De Longis, Frank Welker, Ken Sansom, and Nancy Cartwright
 Chronicle of a Death Foretold (Crónica de una muerte anunciada), directed by Francesco Rosi, starring Rupert Everett, Ornella Muti, Gian Maria Volonté - (France/Italy/Colombia)
 City on Fire (Lóng hǔ fēng yún), directed by Ringo Lam, starring Chow Yun-fat, Danny Lee, Sun Yueh, Carrie Ng, and Roy Cheung (Hong Kong)
 Coast to Coast, directed by Sandy Johnson, starring Lenny Henry, and John Shea - (U.K.)
 Cobra Verde, directed by Werner Herzog, starring Klaus Kinski - (West Germany)
 Cold Steel, directed by Dorothy Ann Puzo, starring Brad Davis and Sharon Stone
 Crazy Love (Amor Loco), directed by Dominique Deruddere, starring Josse De Pauw, and Gene Bervoets (Belgium)
 Creepshow 2, directed by Michael Gornick, starring Lois Chiles, George Kennedy, Dorothy Lamour, and Tom Savini
 Critical Condition, directed by Michael Apted, starring Richard Pryor
 Cross My Heart, directed by Armyan Bernstein, starring Martin Short, Annette O'Toole, Paul Reiser
 Cry Freedom, directed by Richard Attenborough, starring Kevin Kline and Denzel Washington - (UK/US/South Africa)
 The Cry of the Owl ( Le cri du hibou), directed by Claude Chabrol, starring Christophe Malavoy, Mathilda May, and Virginie Thévenet(France)
 The Curse, directed by David Keith, starring Wil Wheaton, Claude Akins, Malcolm Danare, Cooper Huckabee, and John Schneider (United States/Italy)
 The Cyclist (Bicycleran), directed by Mohsen Makhmalbaf, starring Moharram Zaynalzadeh (Iran)

D
 Dark Eyes (Oci ciornie), directed by Nikita Mikhalkov, starring Marcello Mastroianni, Marthe Keller, Yelena Safonova, Pina Cei, Vsevolod Larionov, and Innokenti Smoktunovsky (Italy/U.S.S.R.)
 Dark Tower, directed by Freddie Francis and Ken Wiederhorn, starring Michael Moriarty, Jenny Agutter, Carol Lynley
 Date with an Angel, directed by Tom McLoughlin, starring Michael E. Knight, Phoebe Cates, Emmanuelle Béart, and David Dukes
 Daughter of the Nile (Niluohe nuer), directed by Hou Hsiao-hsien, starring Lin Yang, Jack Kao, and Li Tian-lu (Taiwan)
 Days to Remember (Die Verliebten), directed by Jeanine Meerapfel, starring Barbara Sukowa - (West Germany)
 The Dead, directed by John Huston, starring his daughter, Anjelica Huston - (UK/Ireland/US)
 Dead of Winter, directed by Arthur Penn, starring Mary Steenburgen, Roddy McDowall, Jan Rubeš, and William Russ
 Deadline, directed by Nathaniel Gutman, starring Christopher Walken, and Hywel Bennett
 Deadly Illusion, directed by Larry Cohen and William Tannen, starring Billy Dee Williams
 Dear America: Letters Home from Vietnam, aka Dear America, directed by Bill Couturié, documentary film about the Vietnam War
 Death Before Dishonor, directed by Terry Leonard, starring Fred Dryer, Brian Keith, Joanna Pacuła, and Paul Winfield
 Death Wish 4: The Crackdown, directed by J. Lee Thompson, starring Charles Bronson and Kay Lenz
 Desyat Negrityat (Ten Little Negroes, Ten Little Indians), film adaptation of the novel And Then There Were None (1939) by Agatha Christie. Directed by Stanislav Govorukhin, starring Vladimir Zeldin, Tatyana Drubich, Alexander Kaidanovsky, Aleksei Zharkov, Anatoli Romashin, and Lyudmila Maksakova (U.S.S.R.)
 Diary for My Lovers (Napló szerelmeimnek), directed by Márta Mészáros, starring Ágnes Csere (Hungary)
 Dirty Dancing, directed by Emile Ardolino, starring Patrick Swayze, Jennifer Grey and Jerry Orbach
 Disorderlies, directed by Michael Schultz, starring The Fat Boys, Ralph Bellamy, Tony Plana, and Anthony Geary
 Dolls, directed by Stuart Gordon, starring Stephen Lee, Guy Rolfe, Hilary Mason, and Bunty Bailey
 Down Twisted, directed by Albert Pyun, starring Carey Lowell, Charles Rocket, Trudy Dotchterman, Norbert Weisser, Linda Kerridge, Nicholas Guest, Thom Mathews, Courteney Cox, and Galyn Görg
 Dragnet, directed by Tom Mankiewicz, starring Dan Aykroyd, Tom Hanks, Harry Morgan, Alexandra Paul, Dabney Coleman, Christopher Plummer
 Dragon Ball: Sleeping Princess in Devil's Castle (Doragon Bōru: Majin-Jō No Nemuri Hime), directed by Daisuke Nishio, starring Masako Nozawa, Hiromi Tsuru, Mayumi Tanaka, Tōru Furuya, Mami Koyama, Kōhei Miyauchi, Naoki Tatsuta, Naoko Watanabe, and Shōzō Iizuka (Japan)
 Dudes, directed by Penelope Spheeris, starring Jon Cryer, Daniel Roebuck, Catherine Mary Stewart, Flea, Lee Ving, Billy Ray Sharkey, and Glenn Withrow

E
 Eastern Condors (Dung fong tuk ying), directed by Sammo Hung, starring Sammo Hung, Yuen Biao, Joyce Godenzi, Yuen Wah, Lam Ching-ying, Yuen Woo-ping, Corey Yuen, and Billy Chow (Hong Kong)
 Eat the Rich, directed by Peter Richardson, starring Nosher Powell, Ronald Allen, Nigel Planer, and Miranda Richardson (U.K.)
 Eddie Murphy Raw, performance documentary, directed by Robert Townsend, starring Eddie Murphy
 Eien no 1/2 (Half of Eternity), directed by Kichitaro Negishi, starring Saburō Tokitō, and Shinobu Otake (Japan)
 The Emperor's Naked Army Marches On (Yuki Yukite Shingun), documentary film about World War II, directed by Kazuo Hara (Japan)
 Empire of the Sun, directed by Steven Spielberg, starring Christian Bale, John Malkovich, Miranda Richardson
 End of the Line, directed by Jay Russell, starring Kevin Bacon, Wilford Brimley, Mary Steenburgen, Holly Hunter
 Enemy Territory, directed by Peter Manoogian, starring Gary Frank, Ray Parker Jr., Frances Fisher
 Ernest Goes to Camp, directed by John R. Cherry III, starring Jim Varney
 Escape from Sobibor, directed by Jack Gold, starring Alan Arkin, Joanna Pacuła, Rutger Hauer - (UK/Yugoslavia)
 Evil Dead II, directed by Sam Raimi, starring Bruce Campbell, Sarah Berry, Dan Hicks, and Kassie DePaiva
 Extreme Prejudice, directed by Walter Hill, starring Nick Nolte, Powers Boothe, María Conchita Alonso, Rip Torn

F
 The Family (La famiglia), directed by Ettore Scola, starring Vittorio Gassman and Stefania Sandrelli - (Italy)
 Family Viewing, directed by Atom Egoyan, starring David Hemblen, Aidan Tierney, Gabrielle Rose, and Arsinée Khanjian (Canada)
 Fatal Attraction, directed by Adrian Lyne, starring Michael Douglas, Glenn Close, Anne Archer
 Fatal Beauty, directed by Tom Holland, starring Whoopi Goldberg, Sam Elliott, Rubén Blades, Harris Yulin, John P. Ryan, and Jennifer Warren
 Five Corners, directed by Tony Bill, starring Tim Robbins, Jodie Foster, John Turturro
 Flowers in the Attic, directed by Jeffrey Bloom, starring Victoria Tennant, Kristy Swanson, Louise Fletcher, and Jeb Stuart Adams
 Four Adventures of Reinette and Mirabelle (Quatre aventures de Reinette et Mirabelle), directed by Éric Rohmer, starring Joëlle Miquel, Jessica Forde, Philippe Laudenbach, and Marie Rivière (France)
 The Fourth Protocol, directed by John Mackenzie, starring Michael Caine and Pierce Brosnan - (U.K.)
 Freckled Max and the Spooks (Pehavý Max a strašidlá), directed by Juraj Jakubisko, starring Martin Hreben (Czechoslovakia)
 From the Hip, directed by Bob Clark, starring Judd Nelson, Elizabeth Perkins, John Hurt
 Full Metal Jacket, directed by Stanley Kubrick, starring Matthew Modine, Vincent D'Onofrio, R. Lee Ermey, Adam Baldwin, Arliss Howard

G
 G.I. Joe: The Movie, directed by Don Jurwich, starring Don Johnson and Burgess Meredith
 The Garbage Pail Kids Movie, directed by Rod Amateau, starring Anthony Newley, Mackenzie Astin, and Katie Barberi
 Gardens of Stone, directed by Francis Ford Coppola, starring James Caan, Anjelica Huston, D.B. Sweeney, James Earl Jones
 The Gate, directed by Tibor Takács, starring Stephen Dorff
 The Glass Menagerie, directed by Paul Newman, starring Joanne Woodward and John Malkovich
 Going Bananas, directed by Boaz Davidson, starring Dom DeLuise, Jimmie Walker, David Mendenhall, Deep Roy, Warren Berlinger, and Herbert Lom
 Good Morning, Babylon, directed by Paolo and Vittorio Taviani, starring Vincent Spano and Greta Scacchi - (Italy)
 Good Morning, Vietnam, directed by Barry Levinson, starring Robin Williams, Forest Whitaker, J. T. Walsh, Bruno Kirby
 Gor, directed by Fritz Kiersch, starring Urbano Barberini, Rebecca Ferratti, and Oliver Reed
 The Grand Highway (Le grand chemin), directed by Jean-Loup Hubert, starring Richard Bohringer, and Anémone (France)
 Da Grande, directed by Franco Amurri, starring Renato Pozzetto (Italy)
 Ground Zero, directed by Bruce Myles and Michael Pattinson, starring Colin Friels and Jack Thompson - (Australia)

H
 Hamburger Hill, directed by John Irvin, starring Dylan McDermott
 Hamlet Goes Business (Hamlet liikemaailmassa), directed by Aki Kaurismäki, starring Pirkka-Pekka Petelius (Finland)
 Hangmen, directed by J. Christian Ingvordsen, starring Sandra Bullock
 The Hanoi Hilton, directed by Lionel Chetwynd, starring Michael Moriarty
 Happy New Year, directed by John G. Avildsen, starring Peter Falk, Charles Durning, Wendy Hughes, Tom Courtenay
 Hard Ticket to Hawaii, directed by Andy Sidaris, starring Ronn Moss, Dona Speir, and Cynthia Brimhall
 Harry and the Hendersons, directed by William Dear, starring John Lithgow, Melinda Dillon, Don Ameche, David Suchet, Margaret Langrick, Joshua Rudoy, Lainie Kazan, and Kevin Peter Hall
 Hello Again, directed by Frank Perry, starring Shelley Long, Corbin Bernsen, Judith Ivey, Sela Ward, Gabriel Byrne
 Hello Mary Lou: Prom Night II, directed by Bruce Pittman, starring Michael Ironside, Wendy Lyon, Louis Ferreira, Lisa Schrage, and Richard Monette (Canada)
 Hellraiser, directed by Clive Barker, starring Andrew Robinson, Clare Higgins, and Ashley Laurence (UK/US)
 The Hidden, directed by Jack Sholder, starring Kyle MacLachlan and Michael Nouri
 Hidden City, directed by Stephen Poliakoff, starring Charles Dance - (U.K.)
 Hiding Out, directed by Bob Giraldi, starring Jon Cryer, and Annabeth Gish
 High Season, directed by Clare Peploe, starring Jacqueline Bisset, James Fox, Irene Papas, Kenneth Branagh, Lesley Manville, Robert Stephens, and Sebastian Shaw
 High Tide, directed by Gillian Armstrong, starring Judy Davis - (Australia)
 Hollywood Shuffle, directed by and starring Robert Townsend
 Hope and Glory, directed by John Boorman, starring Sammi Davis, Sarah Miles - Golden Globe Award for Best Picture (Musical or Comedy) - (UK/US)
 Hot Pursuit, directed by Steven Lisberger, starring John Cusack, Robert Loggia, Wendy Gazelle, and Jerry Stiller
 House II: The Second Story, directed by Ethan Wiley, starring Arye Gross, Jonathan Stark, Royal Dano, Lar Park Lincoln, and John Ratzenberger
 House of Games, directed by David Mamet, starring Joe Mantegna and Lindsay Crouse
 Housekeeping, directed by Bill Forsyth, starring Christine Lahti
 A Hungarian Fairy Tale (Hol volt, hol nem volt), directed by Gyula Gazdag, starring Eszter Csákányi (Hungary)
 Hunk, directed by Lawrence Bassoff, starring John Allen Nelson, Steve Levitt, and James Coco

I
 Innerspace, directed by Joe Dante, starring Dennis Quaid, Martin Short, Meg Ryan
 In the Mood, directed by Phil Alden Robinson, starring Patrick Dempsey and Beverly D'Angelo
 Intervista (Interview), directed by and starring Federico Fellini - (Italy)
 Iron Earth, Copper Sky (Yer Demir Gök Bakır), directed by O. Z. Livaneli, starring Rutkay Aziz (Turkey)
 Ironweed, directed by Héctor Babenco, starring Jack Nicholson and Meryl Streep
 Ishtar, directed by Elaine May, starring Warren Beatty, Dustin Hoffman, Isabelle Adjani, Charles Grodin
 It's Alive III: Island of the Alive, directed by Larry Cohen, starring Michael Moriarty, Karen Black, Laurene Landon, James Dixon, Gerrit Graham, Macdonald Carey, and Neal Israel
 I've Heard the Mermaids Singing, directed by Patricia Rozema, starring Sheila McCarthy, Paule Baillargeon, and Ann-Marie MacDonald (Canada)

J
 Jaws: The Revenge, directed by Joseph Sargent, starring Lorraine Gary and Michael Caine
 Julia and Julia, directed by Peter Del Monte, starring Kathleen Turner, Gabriel Byrne, and Sting (Italy)

K
 Kaash (If Only), directed by Mahesh Bhatt, starring Jackie Shroff, and Dimple Kapadia (India)
 Kadamai Kanniyam Kattupaadu (Duty, Discipline, Control), directed by Santhana Bharathi, starring Sathyaraj, Geetha, Jeevitha, Kamal Haasan, Nassar, Delhi Ganesh, Kamala Kamesh, Nalini, Sivachandran, V. K. Ramasamy, Malaysia Vasudevan, and Major Sundararajan (India)
 Kelid (The Key), directed by Ebrahim Forouzesh, starring Mahnaz Ansarian (Iran)
 The Kindred, directed by Jeffrey Obrow and Stephen Carpenter, starring David Allen Brooks, Amanda Pays, Talia Balsam, Kim Hunter, and Rod Steiger
 King Lear, directed by Jean-Luc Godard, starring Peter Sellars, Burgess Meredith, Molly Ringwald
 King of the Children (Háizǐ Wáng), directed by Chen Kaige, starring Chen Shaohua, and Xie Yuan (China)
 Kingsajz (Kingsize), directed by Juliusz Machulski, starring Jacek Chmielnik (Poland)
 The Kreutzer Sonata, directed by Mikhail Schweitzer, starring Oleg Yankovskiy, and Aleksandr Trofimov (U.S.S.R.)

L
 La Bamba, directed by Luis Valdez,  starring Lou Diamond Phillips and Esai Morales
 Lady Beware, directed by Karen Arthur, starring Diane Lane
 The Last Emperor, directed by Bernardo Bertolucci, starring John Lone and Joan Chen - Academy and Golden Globe (drama) Awards for Best Picture - (China/U.K./Italy)
 The Last of England, directed by Derek Jarman, starring Tilda Swinton and Nigel Terry - (U.K.)
 Late Summer Blues (Blues Lahofesh Hagadol), directed by Renen Schorr, starring Yoav Tzafir, Dor Zweigenbom, Shahar Segal, Noa Goldberg, and Omri Dolev (Israel)
 Laughter and Grief by the White Sea (Smekh i gore u Bela morya), directed by Leonid Nosyrev, starring Tatyana Vasilyeva, Klara Rumyanova, and Yevgeniy Leonov (U.S.S.R.)
 Law of Desire (La ley del deseo), directed by Pedro Almodóvar, starring Antonio Banderas, Carmen Maura - (Spain)
 Leonard Part 6, directed by Paul Weiland, starring Bill Cosby, Tom Courtenay, and Joe Don Baker. The film won three Razzie Awards for Worst Picture, Actor and Screenplay
 Less than Zero, directed by Marek Kanievska, starring Andrew McCarthy, Jami Gertz, Robert Downey, Jr., James Spader
 Lethal Weapon, directed by Richard Donner, starring Mel Gibson and Danny Glover
 Light of Day, directed by Paul Schrader, starring Michael J. Fox, Joan Jett, Gena Rowlands
 The Lighthorsemen, directed by Simon Wincer, starring Jon Blake, Peter Phelps, Tony Bonner, Bill Kerr, John Walton, Gary Sweet, Tim McKenzie, Sigrid Thornton, and Anthony Andrews (Australia)
 Like Father Like Son, directed by Rod Daniel, starring Dudley Moore and Kirk Cameron
 Lionheart, directed by Franklin J. Schaffner, starring Eric Stoltz and Gabriel Byrne
 The Living Daylights, directed by John Glen, starring Timothy Dalton (as James Bond), with Maryam d'Abo, Joe Don Baker - (U.K.)
 The Lonely Passion of Judith Hearne, directed by Jack Clayton, starring Maggie Smith and Bob Hoskins - (U.K.)
 Long Gone, directed by Martin Davidson, starring William Petersen, Virginia Madsen, Dermot Mulroney
 The Lost Boys, directed by Joel Schumacher, starring Jason Patric, Corey Haim, Kiefer Sutherland, Corey Feldman, Jami Gertz, Dianne Wiest
 Love at Stake, directed by John Moffitt, starring Patrick Cassidy, Kelly Preston, Barbara Carrera
 Love is a Fat Woman (El Amor es una mujer gorda), directed by Alejandro Agresti, starring Elio Marchi, and Sergio Poves Campos (Argentina)
 El Lute: Run for Your Life (El Lute: camina o revienta), directed by Vicente Aranda, starring Imanol Arias, and Victoria Abril (Spain)

M
 Macbeth, an opera, directed by Claude d'Anna, starring Leo Nucci (France)
 Made in Heaven, directed by Alan Rudolph, starring Timothy Hutton and Kelly McGillis
 Maid to Order, directed by Amy Holden Jones, starring Ally Sheedy, Beverly D'Angelo, Michael Ontkean, Valerie Perrine, Dick Shawn, and Tom Skerritt
 Making Mr. Right, directed by Susan Seidelman, starring Ann Magnuson and John Malkovich
 Malone, directed by Harley Cokeliss, starring Burt Reynolds, Cliff Robertson, Kenneth McMillan, Lauren Hutton, Cynthia Gibb
 A Man from the Boulevard des Capucines (Chelovek s bulvara Kaputsinov), directed by Alla Surikova, starring Andrei Mironov, Aleksandra Yakovleva, Nikolai Karachentsov, Oleg Tabakov, Mikhail Boyarsky, and Igor Kvasha (U.S.S.R.)
 A Man in Love, directed by Diane Kurys, starring Peter Coyote, and Greta Scacchi (Italy)
 Man On Fire, directed by Élie Chouraqui, starring Scott Glenn, Brooke Adams, Danny Aiello, Joe Pesci, Paul Shenar, and Jonathan Pryce
 The Man Who Planted Trees (L'homme qui plantait des arbres), directed by Frédéric Back, starring Philippe Noiret, and Christopher Plummer(Canada)
 Mannequin, directed by Michael Gottlieb, starring Andrew McCarthy and Kim Cattrall
 Masks (Masques), directed by Claude Chabrol, starring Philippe Noiret - (France)
 Masters of the Universe, directed by Gary Goddard, starring Dolph Lundgren, Frank Langella, Courteney Cox
 Matewan, directed by John Sayles, starring Chris Cooper, Will Oldham, David Strathairn
 Maurice, directed by James Ivory, starring James Wilby, Hugh Grant and Ben Kingsley - (U.K.)
 Miami Connection, directed by Richard Park (also known as Park Woo-sang) and Y.K. Kim, starring Y.K. Kim
 Mio in the Land of Faraway (Mio Min Mio), directed by Vladimir Grammatikov, starring Christopher Lee and Christian Bale - (Sweden/U.S.S.R./Norway)
 The Monster Squad, directed by Fred Dekker, starring Andre Gower, Duncan Regehr, Stephen Macht, Stan Shaw, and Tom Noonan
 A Month in the Country, directed by Pat O'Connor, starring Colin Firth, Kenneth Branagh and Natasha Richardson - (U.K.)
 Moonstruck, directed by Norman Jewison, starring Cher, Nicolas Cage, Vincent Gardenia, Olympia Dukakis, Danny Aiello
 Morgan Stewart's Coming Home, directed by Alan Smithee, Paul Aaron, and Terry Winsor, starring Jon Cryer, Viveka Davis, Paul Gleason, Nicholas Pryor, Lynn Redgrave, and Savely Kramarov
 Morning Patrol, directed by Nikos Nikolaidis, starring Michele Valley, Takis Spiridakis, Liana Hatzi, Nikos Hatzis, V. Kabouri, Takis Loukatos, H. Mavros, Panos Thanassoulis, and Rania Trivela (Greece)
 The Mother of Kings (Matka Królów), directed by Janusz Zaorski, starring Magda Teresa Wójcik. Produced in 1982 but not released until 1987 - (Poland)
 Mr. India, directed by Shekhar Kapur, starring Anil Kapoor and Sridevi - (India)
 Mr. Muhsin (Muhsin Bey), directed by Yavuz Turgul, starring Şener Şen, and Uğur Yücel (Turkey)
 Mr. Nice Guy, directed by Henry Wolfond, starring Mike MacDonald and Jan Smithers
 My Best Friend Is a Vampire, directed by Jimmy Huston, starring Robert Sean Leonard, Cheryl Pollak, René Auberjonois, Evan Mirand, Fannie Flagg, Paul Willson, Cecilia Peck, and David Warner
 My Demon Lover, directed by Charlie Loventhal, starring Scott Valentine, Michele Little, Robert Trebor, Alan Fudge, Gina Gallego, and Arnold Johnson
 My Life as a Dog (Mitt liv som hund), directed by Lasse Hallström, starring Anton Glanzelius, Tomas von Brömssen. The film won a Golden Space Needle award - (Sweden)

N
 Nadine, directed by Robert Benton, starring Jeff Bridges and Kim Basinger
 Nayakan (The Hero), directed by Mani Ratnam, starring Kamal Haasan, Saranya Ponvannan, and Karthika (India)
 Near Dark, directed by Kathryn Bigelow, starring Adrian Pasdar, Lance Henriksen, Bill Paxton
 Nekromantik, directed by Jörg Buttgereit, starring Daktari Lorenz, Beatrice Manowski, and Harald Lundt (West Germany)
 Neo Tokyo, anthology film, co-directed by Rintaro, Yoshiaki Kawajiri, and Katsuhiro Otomo. Starring Hideko Yoshida, Masane Tsukayama, and Yū Mizushima (Japan)
 Night Zoo (Un Zoo la Nuit), directed by Jean-Claude Lauzon, starring Gilles Maheu, Lynne Adams, and Roger Lebel (Canada)
 A Nightmare on Elm Street 3: Dream Warriors, directed by Chuck Russell, starring Craig Wasson and Heather Langenkamp
 No Man's Land, directed by Peter Werner, starring Charlie Sheen, D. B. Sweeney, Randy Quaid
 No Way Out, directed by Roger Donaldson, starring Kevin Costner, Gene Hackman, Sean Young, Will Patton, Iman
 North Shore, directed by William Phelps, starring Matt Adler, Nia Peeples, John Philbin, Gerry Lopez, and Gregory Harrison
 Nowhere to Hide, directed by Mario Philip Azzopardi, starring Amy Madigan and Michael Ironside
 Nukie, directed by Sias Odendaal and Michael Pakleppa, starring Steve Railsback, and Glynis Johns (South Africa)
 Number One with a Bullet, directed by Jack Smight, starring Robert Carradine and Billy Dee Williams
 Nuts, directed by Martin Ritt, starring Barbra Streisand, Richard Dreyfuss, Karl Malden, Maureen Stapleton, Eli Wallach, James Whitmore

O
 O.C. and Stiggs, directed by Robert Altman, starring Daniel H. Jenkins, Neill Barry, Martin Mull, Jane Curtin, Dennis Hopper
 Opera, directed by Dario Argento, starring Cristina Marsillach, Ian Charleson, Urbano Barberini, Coralina Cataldi-Tassoni, and William McNamara(Italy)
 Orphans, directed by Alan J. Pakula, starring Matthew Modine, Kevin Anderson, Albert Finney
 Outrageous Fortune, directed by Arthur Hiller, starring Bette Midler and Shelley Long
 Over the Top, directed by Menahem Golan, starring Sylvester Stallone, Robert Loggia, David Mendenhall
 Overboard, directed by Garry Marshall, starring Kurt Russell, Goldie Hawn, Edward Herrmann

P
 P.K. and the Kid, directed by Lou Lombardo, starring Paul Le Mat, Molly Ringwald, Alex Rocco, Charles Hallahan, Fionnula Flanagan, Bert Remsen, and Esther Rolle
 Partition, directed by Ken McMullen, starring Saeed Jaffrey - (U.K.)
 Pathfinder (Veiviseren), directed by Nils Gaup, starring Mikkel Gaup, Nils Utsi, and Helgi Skúlason (Norway)
 Pelle the Conqueror, directed by Bille August, starring Max von Sydow - Academy and Golden Globe Awards for Best Foreign Language Film (for 1988) - (Denmark)
 Personal Services, directed by Terry Jones, starring Julie Walters - (U.K.)
 The Pick-up Artist, directed by James Toback, starring Robert Downey, Jr., Molly Ringwald, Danny Aiello, Dennis Hopper
 Pinocchio and the Emperor of the Night, directed by Hal Sutherland, starring Scott Grimes, Tom Bosley, Edward Asner, Frank Welker, Jonathan Harris, James Earl Jones, William Windom, Don Knotts, and Rickie Lee Jones
 Planes, Trains and Automobiles, directed by John Hughes, starring Steve Martin and John Candy
 Police Academy 4: Citizens on Patrol, directed by Jim Drake, starring Steve Guttenberg, Bubba Smith, Michael Winslow, David Graf, Tim Kazurinsky, Sharon Stone, Marion Ramsey, Lance Kinsey, Leslie Easterbrook, Colleen Camp, G. W. Bailey, Bobcat Goldthwait, and George Gaynes
 A Prayer for the Dying, directed by Mike Hodges, starring Mickey Rourke, Bob Hoskins, Alan Bates, and Liam Neeson (UK/US)
 Predator, directed by John McTiernan, starring Arnold Schwarzenegger and Carl Weathers
 Prick Up Your Ears, directed by Stephen Frears, starring Gary Oldman, a biopic of playwright Joe Orton - (U.K.)
 Prince of Darkness, directed by John Carpenter, starring Donald Pleasence, Jameson Parker, Victor Wong
 The Princess Bride, directed by Rob Reiner, starring Cary Elwes, Robin Wright, Mandy Patinkin, Chris Sarandon, Wallace Shawn, André the Giant
 The Principal, directed by Christopher Cain, starring James Belushi and Louis Gossett Jr.
 Prison on Fire (Jian yu feng yun), directed by Ringo Lam, starring Chow Yun-fat and Tony Leung - (Hong Kong)
 Project A Part II ('A' gai wak juk jap), directed by and starring Jackie Chan, starring Maggie Cheung - (Hong Kong)
 Project X, directed by Jonathan Kaplan, starring Matthew Broderick and Helen Hunt
 Promised Land, directed by Michael Hoffman, starring Kiefer Sutherland, Meg Ryan, Jason Gedrick, and Tracy Pollan

Q
 Queenie, television miniseries, directed by Larry Peerce, starring Mia Sara

R
 Radio Days, directed by Woody Allen, starring Dianne Wiest, Mia Farrow, Michael Tucker, Julie Kavner, Wallace Shawn
 Raising Arizona, directed by the Coen Brothers, starring Nicolas Cage and Holly Hunter
 Rampage, directed by William Friedkin, starring Michael Biehn
 Real Men, directed by Dennis Feldman, starring James Belushi and John Ritter
 Red Sorghum (Hong gao liang), directed by Zhang Yimou, starring Gong Li and Jiang Wen - Golden Bear award (for 1988) - (China)
 Reflections (Već viđeno), directed by Goran Marković, starring Mustafa Nadarević, Anica Dobra, Milorad Mandić, Bogdan Diklić, and Gordana Gadžić (Yugoslavia)
 Rent-a-Cop, directed by Jerry London, starring Burt Reynolds, Liza Minnelli, Dionne Warwick
 Return to Horror High, directed by Bill Froehlich, starring George Clooney, and Vince Edwards
 A Return to Salem's Lot, directed by Larry Cohen, starring Michael Moriarty, Andrew Duggan, Samuel Fuller, Evelyn Keyes, and June Havoc
 Revenge of the Nerds II: Nerds in Paradise, directed by Joe Roth, starring Robert Carradine and Courtney Thorne-Smith
 Rita, Sue and Bob Too, directed by Alan Clarke, starring Michelle Holmes, Siobhan Finneran, George Costigan, and Lesley Sharp (U.K.)
 RoboCop, directed by Paul Verhoeven, starring Peter Weller and Nancy Allen
 Robot Carnival, anthology film, co-directed by Atsuko Fukushima, Katsuhiro Otomo, Koji Morimoto, Hidetoshi Omori, Yasuomi Umetsu, Hiroyuki Kitazume, Mao Lamdo, Hiroyuki Kitakubo, and Takashi Nakamura. Starring Kohji Moritsugu (Japan)
 Roxanne, directed by Fred Schepisi, starring Steve Martin and Daryl Hannah
 Royal Space Force: The Wings of Honnêamise (Ōritsu Uchūgun: Oneamisu no Tsubasa), directed by Hiroyuki Yamaga, starring Leo Morimoto, and Mitsuki Yayoi (Japan)
 The Running Man, directed by Paul Michael Glaser, starring Arnold Schwarzenegger, María Conchita Alonso, Yaphet Kotto, and Richard Dawson
 Russkies, directed by Rick Rosenthal, starring Whip Hubley, Joaquin Phoenix, and Peter Billingsley

S
 Sammy and Rosie Get Laid, directed by Stephen Frears, starring Shashi Kapoor and Claire Bloom - (U.K.)
 Satyamev Jayate, directed by Raj N. Sippy, starring Vinod Khanna, Meenakshi Sheshadri, Madhavi, and Anita Raj (India)
 The Secret of My Success, directed by Herbert Ross, starring Michael J. Fox and Helen Slater
 September, directed by Woody Allen, starring Mia Farrow, Dianne Wiest, Sam Waterston, Jack Warden, Elaine Stritch
 Shy People, directed by Andrei Konchalovsky, starring Barbara Hershey and Jill Clayburgh
 The Sicilian, directed by Michael Cimino, starring Christopher Lambert
 Siesta, directed by Mary Lambert, starring Ellen Barkin, Gabriel Byrne, Isabella Rossellini, Martin Sheen, Jodie Foster
 Sign 'o' the Times, directed by Prince and Albert Magnoli, a concert film starring Prince
 Silent Night, Deadly Night Part 2
 Sister, Sister, directed by Bill Condon, starring Jennifer Jason Leigh, Judith Ivey, Eric Stoltz
 Slam Dance, directed by Wayne Wang, starring Virginia Madsen, Tom Hulce, Mary Elizabeth Mastrantonio
 Sleeping Beauty, directed by David Irving, starring Tahnee Welch, Kenny Baker, and Morgan Fairchild
 Snow White, directed by Michael Berz, starring Diana Rigg, Sarah Patterson, Billy Barty, and Nicola Stapleton
 Some Kind of Wonderful, directed by Howard Deutch, starring Eric Stoltz, Mary Stuart Masterson, Lea Thompson, Craig Sheffer
 Someone to Love, directed by and starring Henry Jaglom, with Orson Welles
 Someone to Watch Over Me, directed by Ridley Scott, starring Tom Berenger, Mimi Rogers, Lorraine Bracco
 Spaceballs, directed by and starring Mel Brooks, with John Candy, Rick Moranis, Daphne Zuniga, Bill Pullman, Joan Rivers
 Square Dance,  directed by Daniel Petrie, starring Winona Ryder, Jason Robards, Jane Alexander, and Rob Lowe
 The Squeeze, directed by Roger Young, starring Michael Keaton, Rae Dawn Chong, and Joe Pantoliano
 Stage Fright (Deliria), directed by Michele Soavi, starring David Brandon, and Barbara Cupisti (Italy)
 Stakeout, directed by John Badham, starring Richard Dreyfuss, Emilio Estevez, Madeleine Stowe
 Steel Dawn, directed by Lance Hool, starring Patrick Swayze, Lisa Niemi, Christopher Neame, Brett Hool, Brion James, and Anthony Zerbe
 The Stepfather, directed by Joseph Ruben, starring Terry O'Quinn, Jill Schoelen, and Shelley Hack
 Storm, directed by David Winning, starring David Palffy, Stan Kane, Tom Schioler, Harry Freedman, and Lawrence Elion (Canada)
 Straight to Hell, directed by Alex Cox, starring Courtney Love and Joe Strummer - (UK/US/Spain)
 Street Smart, directed by Jerry Schatzberg, starring Christopher Reeve, Kathy Baker and Morgan Freeman
 Street Trash, directed by J. Michael Muro, starring Mike Lackey, R. L. Ryan, James Lorinz, and Vic Noto
 Strike Commando, directed by Bruno Mattei, starring Reb Brown (Italy)
 Subway to the Stars (Um Trem para as Estrelas), directed by Carlos Diegues and Tereza Gonzalez, starring Guilherme Fontes (Brazil)
 Summer Camp Nightmare, directed by Bert L. Dragin, starring Chuck Connors, Charlie Stratton, and Harold Pruett
 Summer School, directed by Carl Reiner, starring Mark Harmon and Kirstie Alley
 Superman IV: The Quest for Peace, directed by Sidney J. Furie, starring Christopher Reeve, Gene Hackman, Margot Kidder, Mariel Hemingway, Jon Cryer
 Surrender, directed by Jerry Belson, starring Sally Field, Michael Caine, Steve Guttenberg, Peter Boyle
 The Surrogate Woman (Ssibaji), directed by Im Kwon-taek, starring Kang Soo-yeon (South Korea)
 Suspect, directed by Peter Yates, starring Cher, Dennis Quaid, John Mahoney, Joe Mantegna, Liam Neeson
 Swimming to Cambodia, directed by Jonathan Demme, starring Spalding Gray

T
 A Taxing Woman (Marusa no onna), directed by Juzo Itami, starring Nobuko Miyamoto, and Tsutomu Yamazaki (Japan)
 Teen Wolf Too, directed by Christopher Leitch, starring Jason Bateman, Kim Darby, John Astin, Paul Sand, James Hampton, Mark Holton, Estee Chandler, and Stuart Fratkin
 Three for the Road, directed by Bill L. Norton, starring Charlie Sheen, Alan Ruck, Kerri Green, Sally Kellerman, and Blair Tefkin
 Three Men and a Baby, directed by Leonard Nimoy, starring Tom Selleck, Steve Guttenberg, Ted Danson, Nancy Travis
 Three O'Clock High, directed by Phil Joanou, starring Casey Siemaszko, Anne Ryan, Richard Tyson, Jeffrey Tambor, Philip Baker Hall, and John P. Ryan
 Throw Momma from the Train, directed by Danny DeVito, starring Danny DeVito, Billy Crystal, Anne Ramsey, Kate Mulgrew
 A Tiger's Tale, directed by Peter Douglas, starring Ann-Margret, C. Thomas Howell, Kelly Preston
 Timestalkers, directed by Michael Schultz, starring William Devane, Klaus Kinski, and Lauren Hutton
 Tin Men, directed by Barry Levinson, starring Richard Dreyfuss, Danny DeVito, Barbara Hershey, John Mahoney, Jackie Gayle
 Tough Guys Don't Dance, directed by Norman Mailer, starring Ryan O'Neal, Isabella Rossellini, Lawrence Tierney
 Train of Dreams directed by John N. Smith, starring Jason St. Amour, Christopher Neil, and Fred Ward (Canada)
 Travelling North, directed by Carl Schultz, starring Leo McKern, Julia Blake, and Graham Kennedy (Australia)
 Tropic of Ice (Jään kääntöpiiri), directed by Lauri Törhönen, starring Tor Planting (Finland)
 The Trouble with Spies, directed by Burt Kennedy, starring Donald Sutherland and Lucy Gutteridge
 Twilight of the Cockroaches, directed by Hiroaki Yoshida, starring Kaoru Kobayashi (Japan)

U
 The Umbrella Woman, aka The Good Wife, directed by Ken Cameron, starring Rachel Ward, Bryan Brown, Sam Neill
 Under the Sun of Satan (Sous le soleil de Satan), directed by Maurice Pialat, starring Gérard Depardieu and Sandrine Bonnaire. The film won a Palme d'Or award. (France)
 The Untouchables, directed by Brian De Palma, starring Kevin Costner, Sean Connery, Robert De Niro, Andy García, Charles Martin Smith, Patricia Clarkson

V
 Vincent, directed by Paul Cox, documentary film about Vincent van Gogh

W
 Waiting for the Moon, directed by Jill Godmilow, starring Linda Hunt, and Linda Bassett (UK/US/France/West Germany)
 Walk Like a Man, directed by Melvin Frank, starring Howie Mandel
 Walker, directed by Alex Cox, starring Ed Harris - (United States/Mexico/Spain)
 Wall Street, directed by Oliver Stone, starring Michael Douglas, Charlie Sheen, Daryl Hannah, Terence Stamp, Martin Sheen
 Wanted: Dead or Alive, directed by Gary Sherman, starring Rutger Hauer, Gene Simmons, and Robert Guillaume
 Weeds, directed by John D. Hancock, starring Nick Nolte
 The Whales of August, directed by Lindsay Anderson, starring Bette Davis, Lillian Gish, Vincent Price
 Where Is the Friend's Home? (Khane-ye doust kodjast?), directed by Abbas Kiarostami, starring Babak Ahmadpour, and Ahmad Ahmadpour (Iran)
 White Apache, directed by Bruno Mattei and Claudio Fragasso, starring Sebastian Harrison, and Lola Forner (Italy)
 White Mischief, directed by Michael Radford, starring Greta Scacchi, Charles Dance, Joss Ackland, Trevor Howard, John Hurt - (U.K.)
 White of the Eye, directed by Donald Cammell, starring Cathy Moriarty and David Keith - (U.K.)
 White Water Summer, directed by Jeff Bleckner, starring Kevin Bacon, Sean Astin, Jonathan Ward, and Matt Adler
 Who's That Girl, directed by James Foley, starring Madonna and Griffin Dunne
 Why? (Proc?), directed by Karel Smyczek, starring Jiří Langmajer (Czechoslovakia)
 Wicked City, directed by Yoshiaki Kawajiri, starring Yūsaku Yara, Toshiko Fujita, Ichirō Nagai, and Takeshi Aono (Japan)
 Wild Thing, directed by Max Reid,  starring Robert Knepper, and Kathleen Quinlan
 Wings of Desire, directed by Wim Wenders, starring Bruno Ganz and Peter Falk - (West Germany/France)
 Wish You Were Here, directed by David Leland, starring Emily Lloyd and Tom Bell - (U.K.)
 The Witches of Eastwick, directed by George Miller, starring Jack Nicholson, Cher, Susan Sarandon, Michelle Pfeiffer
 Withnail and I, directed by Bruce Robinson, starring Paul McGann, Richard E. Grant, Richard Griffiths - (U.K.)

Y
 The Year My Voice Broke, directed by John Duigan, starring Noah Taylor, Loene Carmen, and Ben Mendelsohn (Australia)
 Yeelen (Brightness), directed by Souleymane Cissé, starring Issiaka Kane, Aoua Sangare, and Niamanto Sanogo (Mali)

Z
 Zegen, directed by Shohei Imamura, starring Mitsuko Baisho (Japan)

Births
 January 1 – Gia Coppola, American director and screenwriter
 January 2 – Shelley Hennig, American actress and model
 January 5 – Fabiola Guajardo, Mexican actress and model
 January 7 – Lyndsy Fonseca, American actress
 January 8
Cynthia Erivo, British actress
Freddie Stroma, British actor and model
 January 12 – Naya Rivera, American actress, singer, and model (died 2020)
 January 13 – Max Van Ville, American DJ, producer, and actor
 January 16 – Carrie Keranen, voice actress, production manager, producer, and voice director
 January 18
Ingvild Deila, Norwegian actress
Zane Holtz, Canadian actor and model
 January 20 – Evan Peters, American actor and producer
 February 1
Heather Morris, American actress, dancer, singer, and model
Ronda Rousey, American professional wrestler and actress
 February 4 – Lewis Tan, English actor and martial artist
 February 5
Darren Criss, American actor, singer, and songwriter
Henry Golding, Malaysian-British actor and television host
Raymond Lee (actor), American actor
 February 6 - Natalia Reyes, Colombian actress
 February 7 – Doua Moua, American actor
 February 9 – Michael B. Jordan, American actor and film producer
 February 20
Daniella Pineda, American actress
Miles Teller, American actor
 February 21
 Ashley Greene, actress
 Elliot Page, Canadian actor
 February 28 – Michelle Horn, American actress
 March 4 – Tamzin Merchant, English actress and author
 March 8 – Milana Vayntrub, American actress and comedian
 March 9 - Bow Wow (rapper), American rapper and actor
 March 10 – Ser'Darius Blain, Haitian-American actor
 March 20 – Rollo Weeks, British former actor
 March 22 – Billy Kametz, American voice actor (died 2022)
 March 26 – Josh Herdman, English actor and mixed martial artist
 March 28 – Jimmy Wong, American actor and musician
 April 1 – Mackenzie Davis, Canadian actress, producer and model
 April 3 – Rachel Bloom, American actress, comedian, writer, singer-songwriter, and producer
 April 4 – Sarah Gadon, actress
 April 6 - Jerrod Carmichael, American stand-up comedian, actor, writer and filmmaker
 April 9 – Jesse McCartney, actor, singer-songwriter and voice actor
 April 10 – Shay Mitchell, Canadian actress and model
 April 19
Oksana Akinshina, Russian actress
Courtland Mead, American actor
 April 20 – John Patrick Amedori, American actor and musician
 April 27 – William Moseley, English actor
 April 28 – Tonia Sotiropoulou, Greek actress
 May 5 – Jessie Cave, English actress and comedian
 May 8 – Aneurin Barnard, Welsh actor
 May 13 – Hunter Parrish, American actor and singer
 May 27 – Bella Heathcote, Australian actress and model
 May 28 – Jessica Rothe, American actress
 May 31 – Meredith Hagner, American actress
 June 6 – Daniel Logan, New Zealand-born American actor
 June 11 – Jimmy O. Yang, Hong Kong-American actor, stand-up comedian and writer
 June 19 - Beattie Edmondson, English actress
 June 22 – Joe Dempsie, English actor
 June 25 – Mary Tsoni, Greek actress and singer (d. 2017)
 June 26 – Valerie Pachner, Austrian actress
 June 27 – Ed Westwick, English film and television actor
 July 6 – Matt O'Leary, American actor
 July 7 – Julianna Guill, American actress
 July 11 – Cristina Vee, American voice actress
 July 15 – Jimmy Rees, Australian entertainer
 July 25 – Michael Welch, American actor
 July 26
Miriam McDonald, Canadian actress
Hallie Meyers-Shyer, American actress and filmmaker
 July 27 – Mara Wilson, actress and writer
 July 29 – Genesis Rodriguez, American actress and model
 July 31 – Brittany Byrnes, Australian actress
 August 8 – Katie Leung, Scottish film, television, and stage actress
 August 18
Mika Boorem, American actress and filmmaker
Óscar Catacora, Peruvian director, screenwriter and cinematographer (died 2021)
 August 19 – Manny Jacinto, Canadian actor
 August 21 – Cody Kasch, American actor
 August 25
Stacey Farber, Canadian actress
Blake Lively, American actress, model, and director
Chloe Pirrie, Scottish actress
Liu Yifei, Chinese-American actress, singer, and model
 September 7 – Evan Rachel Wood, American actress, model, and musician
 September 8
Ray Fisher (actor), American actor
Domee Shi, Chinese-Canadian animator, storyboard artist and director
 September 11 – Tyler Hoechlin, American actor
 September 14 - Jessica Brown Findlay, English actress
 September 17 – Augustus Prew, English actor
 September 19 – Danielle Panabaker, American actress
 September 20 – Sarah Natochenny, American voice actress
 September 22
Tom Felton, English actor
Teyonah Parris, American actress
 September 23 – Skylar Astin, American actor and singer
 September 24
Spencer Treat Clark, American actor
Grey Damon, American actor
 September 28 – Hilary Duff, actress, singer, songwriter, and businesswoman
 September 29
David Del Rio, American actor, director and producer
Anaïs Demoustier, French actress
 October 1 – Michaela Coel, British actress and screenwriter
 October 9 - Melissa Villaseñor, American stand-up comedian, actress, writer and musician
 October 14 – Jay Pharoah, American actor and stand-up comedian
 October 16 – Zhao Liying, Chinese actress
 October 18 – Zac Efron, actor and singer
 October 24 – Lincoln Lewis, Australian actor
 November 5 – Kevin Jonas, American singer-songwriter and actor (Jonas Brothers)
 November 9 – Jennifer Holland, American actress
 November 10 - Andrew Koji, British actor and martial artist
 November 11 – Ludi Lin, Chinese-born Canadian actor and model
 November 12 – Kengo Kora, Japanese actor
 November 14 – Brian Gleeson, Irish actor
 November 18 – Jake Abel, American actor and singer
 November 23 – Vallo Kirs, Estonian actor
 November 27 – Lashana Lynch, Jamaican-British actress
 November 28 – Karen Gillan, Scottish actress and filmmaker
 December 3 – Michael Angarano, American actor
 December 8 – Aria Curzon, American actress
 December 11 – Moe Dunford, Irish actor
 December 28 – Adam Gregory, American actor

Deaths

Film debuts
Patricia Arquette – A Nightmare on Elm Street 3: Dream Warriors
Obba Babatundé – Leonard Part 6
Dylan Baker – Planes, Trains, and Automobiles
Alec Baldwin – Forever, Lulu
Christian Bale – Mio in the Land of Faraway
Jason Bateman – Teen Wolf Too
Kenneth Branagh – A Month in the Country
Sandra Bullock – Hangmen
Vanessa Bell Calloway – Number One with a Bullet
Patricia Clarkson – The Untouchables
George Clooney – Return to Horror High
Chris Cooper – Matewan
John Corbett – Someone to Watch Over Me
Courteney Cox – Down Twisted
Stephen Dorff – The Gate
Illeana Douglas – Hello Again
Edie Falco – Sweet Lorraine
Kurt Fuller – The Running Man 
Gong Li – Red Sorghum
Beth Grant – Under Cover
Richard E. Grant – Withnail and I
Elizabeth Hurley – Aria
Peter Jackson (director) – Bad Taste
Doug Jones – The Newlydeads
Nathan Lane – Ironweed
Anthony LaPaglia – Cold Steel
Robert LaSardo – China Girl
Seth MacFarlane – Untitled Star Trek Fan Film with Seth MacFarlane
Steven Mackintosh – Prick Up Your Ears
Holt McCallany – Creepshow 2
Dylan McDermott – Hamburger Hill
Kevin McDonald – Distant Horizons
Colm Meaney – The Dead
Penelope Ann Miller – Hotshot
Sean Pertwee – Prick Up Your Ears
Brad Pitt – No Man's Land
Glenn Plummer – Who's That Girl
Colin Quinn – Three Men and a Baby
Chris Rock – Beverly Hills Cop II
Katey Sagal – Maid to Order
Joan Severance – Lethal Weapon
David Spade – Police Academy 4: Citizens on Patrol
Ben Stiller – Empire of the Sun
Noah Taylor – The Year My Voice Broke
Uma Thurman – Kiss Daddy Goodnight
Nancy Travis – Three Men and the Baby
Courtney B. Vance – Hamburger Hill
Jesse Ventura – Predator
Patrick Warburton – Dragonard
Frank Whaley – Ironweed
Robin Wright – The Princess Bride

See also
 List of American films of 1987
 List of British films of 1987
 List of French films of 1987
 List of German films of the 1980s
 List of Bollywood films of 1987
 List of Italian films of 1987
 List of Japanese films of 1987
 List of Swedish films of the 1980s

References

External links 
 1987 Domestic Grosses at Box Office Mojo

 
Film by year